Edwin Klein (born 19 June 1948) is a German former athlete. He competed in the men's hammer throw at the 1972 Summer Olympics and the 1976 Summer Olympics.

References

External links
 

1948 births
Living people
Athletes (track and field) at the 1972 Summer Olympics
Athletes (track and field) at the 1976 Summer Olympics
German male hammer throwers
Olympic athletes of West Germany
People from Trier-Saarburg
Sportspeople from Rhineland-Palatinate